Quinton Lenord Ross (born April 30, 1981) is an American former professional basketball player. Ross played college basketball for the SMU Mustangs. He played professionally in NBA for the Los Angeles Clippers, Memphis Grizzlies, Dallas Mavericks, Washington Wizards, and New Jersey Nets.

High school and college
Ross led Dallas's Justin F. Kimball High School to the state finals, but they lost in the championship game.

He went undrafted in the 2003 NBA draft after graduating from Southern Methodist University, where he majored in economics. Ross averaged 14.8 points, 5.5 rebounds, and 1.9 assists in 119 games played over his four-year collegiate career. He finished his career at SMU as the school's fourth all-time leading scorer with 1,763 points, and was named all-Conference USA first team in 2003.

Professional career
He was the final player waived by the Clippers before the start of the regular season. Following that 2003 preseason in which he averaged 5.4 points, 0.8 rebounds, and 0.8 assists in five games with the Clippers, Ross signed with Telindus Oostende of Belgium for one season (2003–04). During his time overseas, he averaged 16.7 points and 4.8 rebounds. Ross signed a four-year free agent contract with the Clippers on August 16, 2004.

On January 17, 2007, Ross scored 24 points in a win against the Golden State Warriors. His previous career high occurred on May 18, 2006, against the Phoenix Suns in game 6 of the Western Conference semifinals, when he scored 18 points.

On September 26, 2008, Ross signed a contract with the Memphis Grizzlies. His first cousin Darrell Arthur was his teammate on the Grizzlies. On July 8, 2009, Ross signed a contract with the Dallas Mavericks.

On February 13, 2010, Ross was traded to the Washington Wizards along with Josh Howard, Drew Gooden and James Singleton for Caron Butler, Brendan Haywood, and DeShawn Stevenson.

On June 29, 2010, Ross was traded to the New Jersey Nets for Yi Jianlian and cash. He was waived by the Nets on March 31, 2011.

During the 2012–13 season, he played for French club Boulazac.

Awards and honors
WAC Player of the Year honors: 2002–03
First Team All-WAC honors: 2003
Associated Press Honorable Mention All-America: 2003

NBA career statistics

Regular season 

|-
| align="left" | 2004–05
| align="left" | L.A. Clippers
| 78 || 19 || 21.3 || .432 || .250 || .673 || 2.7 || 1.4 || .7 || .3 || 5.1
|-
| align="left" | 2005–06
| align="left" | L.A. Clippers
| 67 || 45 || 22.6 || .422 || .000 || .760 || 2.5 || 1.2 || .8 || .2 || 4.7
|-
| align="left" | 2006–07
| align="left" | L.A. Clippers
| 81 || 43 || 21.0 || .467 || .200 || .782 || 2.3 || 1.1 || .9 || .4 || 5.2
|-
| align="left" | 2007–08
| align="left" | L.A. Clippers
| 76 || 44 || 19.8 || .391 || .429 || .667 || 2.3 || 1.2 || .6 || .4 || 4.1
|-
| align="left" | 2008–09
| align="left" | Memphis
| 68 || 7 || 17.1 || .382 || .375 || .810 || 1.9 || .7 || .5 || .2 || 3.9
|-
| align="left" | 2009–10
| align="left" | Dallas
| 27 || 7 || 11.1 || .411 || .231 || .625 || 1.0 || .3 || .3 || .1 || 2.0
|-
| align="left" | 2009–10
| align="left" | Washington
| 25 || 0 || 10.4 || .309 || .125 || .500 || .9 || .2 || .2 || .1 || 1.5
|-
| align="left" | 2010–11
| align="left" | New Jersey
| 36 || 4 || 9.8 || .441 || .000 || .357 || .8 || .3 || .1 || .2 || 1.6
|- class="sortbottom"
| style="text-align:center;" colspan="2"| Career
| 458 || 169 || 18.5 || .419 || .318 || .711 || 2.1 || .9 || .6 || .3 || 4.1

Playoffs 

|-
| align="left" | 2006
| align="left" | L.A. Clippers
| 12 || 10 || 24.5 || .534 || .000 || .875 || 2.7 || .8 || .6 || .7 || 7.7
|- class="sortbottom"
| style="text-align:center;" colspan="2"| Career
| 12 || 10 || 24.5 || .534 || .000 || .875 || 2.7 || .8 || .6 || .7 || 7.7

Notes

External links
NBA.com Profile
Interview
Pictures

1981 births
Living people
African-American basketball players
American expatriate basketball people in Belgium
American expatriate basketball people in France
American men's basketball players
Basketball players from Dallas
BC Oostende players
Canton Charge players
Dallas Mavericks players
Los Angeles Clippers players
Memphis Grizzlies players
New Jersey Nets players
Small forwards
SMU Mustangs men's basketball players
Undrafted National Basketball Association players
Washington Wizards players
21st-century African-American sportspeople
20th-century African-American people